The Malagasy N1A is the top basketball league in Madagascar. Currently, twelve teams play in the competition to determine who is the national champion of Madagascar. The defending champion is GNBC.

The winners of each N1A season play in the qualifiers of the Basketball Africa League (BAL).

Format 
The season begins with 12 teams in two conferences (West and East), the top four qualify for the Elite 8. The bottom team from each group is relegated to the N1B (the national second level). The top four teams from the Elite 8 advance to the Final Four that are played in a best-of-three series to determine the N1A champion.

Teams
These were the 12 teams of the 2022 season:

Winners

Performance by club

Coupe du President
In Madagascar, the national federation also organises a cup competition called the Coupe du President (English: President's Cup).

References

Basketball competitions in Madagascar
Basketball leagues in Africa